2018 Urawa Red Diamonds season.

Squad
As of 17 January 2018.

Out on loan

J1 League

Emperor's Cup

J.League Cup

References

External links
 J.League official site

Urawa Red Diamonds
Urawa Red Diamonds seasons